Full Blast may refer to:

 Full Blast (1999 film), a 1999 Canadian film directed by Rodrigue Jean
 Full Blast (album), a 2004 music album by American rapper MC Hammer